Meltdown is a two-part comic book mini-series published in December 2006 (issue 1) and January 2007 (issue 2) by Image Comics. Written by David Schwartz and illustrated by Sean Wang.

Plot
Meltdown tells the story of Caliente, aka The Flare, a superhero with flame based powers that are killing him. He's only got 7 days left to put his life in order, and to make amends for all of his regrets. The story largely consists of flashbacks that show Caliente's trials and tribulations leading to his final days.

The series was collected into a trade paperback entitled "MELTDOWN: The Definitive Collection", which also featured 52 pages of new material.

References

External links
 Meltdown on Myspace
 Review of issue #1 and #2, Comics Bulletin

2006 comics debuts
Comic book limited series
Image Comics titles